Liolaemus platei, known by the common name braided tree iguana, is a species of lizard in the family Liolaemidae. The species is endemic to Chile.

Geographic range and habitat
This taxon, L. platei, is endemic to the Chilean Matorral ecoregion, ranging from Antofagasta Region in the north through the Atacama Region to the Coquimbo Region in the south.

Taxonomy
L. platei was described as a species new to science in the year 1898 by Austrian herpetologist Franz Werner. Liolaemus curicensis	was formerly considered a subspecies of L. platei.

Etymology
The specific name, platei, is in honor of German zoologist Ludwig Hermann Plate.

Conservation status
L. platei is classified by the IUCN as Least Concern.

Reproduction
L. platei is oviparous.

References

External links
Hogan, C. Michael, & World Wildlife Fund (2013). Chilean Matorral. Ed. Mark McGinley. Encyclopedia of Earth. National Council for Science and the Environment. Washington DC.

Further reading
Beolens, Bo; Watkins, Michael; Grayson, Michael (2011). The Eponym Dictionary of Reptiles. Baltimore: Johns Hopkins University Press. xiii + 296 pp. . (Liolaemus platei, p. 208).
Núñez H, Veloso A (2001). "Distribución geográfica de las especies de lagartos de la región de Antofagasta, Chile ". Bol. Mus. Nac. Hist. Nat. 50: 109–120. (in Spanish).
Werner, Franz (1898). "Die Reptilien und Batrachier der Sammlung Plate ". Zool. Jahrb. Abt. Syst. Oekol. Geogr. Tiere (suppl. 4): 244–278. (Liolaemus platei, new species). (in German).

platei
Lizards of South America
Reptiles of Chile
Endemic fauna of Chile
Chilean Matorral
Reptiles described in 1898
Taxa named by Franz Werner